The Golden Cocoon is a 1925 American silent drama film directed by Millard Webb and written by Louis D. Lighton, and Hope Loring. It is based on the 1924 novel The Golden Cocoon by Ruth Cross. The film stars Huntley Gordon, Helene Chadwick, Richard Tucker, Frank Campeau, Margaret Seddon, and Carrie Clark Ward. The film was released by Warner Bros. on January 30, 1926.

Plot
As described in a review in a film magazine, Molly Shannon (Chadwick), an innocent country girl who wins a university scholarship offered by Gregory Cochran (Gordon), a wealthy judge. She falls in love with one of the professors, Mr. Renfro (Tucker), who jilts her on the eve of their wedding. Aimlessly she wanders about and faints in front of a roadhouse with an evil reputation, and is taken in and revived. As she emerges she is seen by Bancroft (Campeau), a grafting politician who later seeks to use this knowledge to force from the race the judge whom she has since married. The wife disappears, feigning suicide, which is her clever ruse to keep her story out of the paper (at the time, ethic standards at most newspapers prevented publication of any slander against a dead person). Molly is found by Professor Renfro just before the election. He goes to the governor and the wife follows. In a struggle the professor is shot and exonerates the wife, who keeps her secret, saving her husband's career.

Cast

References

External links

1925 films
1920s English-language films
Silent American drama films
1925 drama films
Warner Bros. films
Films directed by Millard Webb
American silent feature films
American black-and-white films
1920s American films